Walnut Grove is a historic house on a Southern plantation in Mount Pleasant, Maury County, Tennessee, USA.

History
The house was completed in 1858, replacing an earlier house that burned and was torn down in 1857. It was designed in the Greek Revival architectural style by Nathan Vaught, a local master builder.

The house was built for Sabrina (Sabra) Boddie Lawrence, who inherited a large plantation and the previous house in 1841. She personally managed the plantation and at the start of the American Civil War was a prominent local landowner, owning almost as much land as any other person in the county.

After Lawrence died in 1867, her heirs sold or leased the house for an Episcopal school for boys around 1880, known has Otey school; the house was used for a few years as a dormitory. It was sold in 1888 and returned to use as a private home. A detached kitchen still exists on the property, built prior to 1826 and surviving the 1857 fire; according to local lore it is the oldest brick building in the Mount Pleasant area.

Heritage significance
It has been listed on the National Register of Historic Places since March 8, 1984, significant as an example of late 1850s Greek Revival style and its association with Lawrence and with Nathan Vaught.

References

Houses on the National Register of Historic Places in Tennessee
Houses in Maury County, Tennessee
Houses completed in 1857
Greek Revival houses in Tennessee
Plantation houses in Tennessee
National Register of Historic Places in Maury County, Tennessee
1857 establishments in Tennessee